Vismieae is a tribe of flowering plants within the St. Johnswort family, Hypericaceae. It contains the genera Harungana, Psorospermum, and Vismia.

References